This is a listing of the horses that finished in either first, second, or third place and the number of starters in the George E. Mitchell Stakes, the second leg of the de facto American Triple Tiara of Thoroughbred Racing. The Black-Eyed Susan Stakes is run at 1-1/8 miles over dirt for three-year-old fillies at Pimlico Race Course in Baltimore, Maryland.

The 18 fillies whose name have ** next to them were named either (16) American Champion Three-Year-Old Filly or (8) American Champion Older Female Horse and in (6) cases they were named Champion in both divisions.

References

External links
Pimlico racetrack

Pimlico Race Course
Lists of horse racing results
Black-Eyed Susan Stakes